Koridze is a Georgian surname. Notable people with the surname include:

 Avtandil Koridze (1935–1966), Georgian Soviet wrestler
 Serhiy Koridze (born 1975), Ukrainian futsal player
 Vakhtang Koridze (born 1949), Georgian Soviet footballer

Georgian-language surnames